Isidro Vamenta was an assemblyman the Mayor of Cagayan de Misamis from 1908 to 1909. He represented Misamis Oriental in the 2nd National Assembly from 1939 to 1941. Vamenta studied law  at the Escuela de Derecho.

References

Mayors of Cagayan de Oro
Members of the House of Representatives of the Philippines from Misamis Oriental
People from Cagayan de Oro
Members of the Philippine Legislature
Members of the National Assembly of the Philippines